Ludwig Döderlein may refer to:

Johann Christoph Wilhelm Ludwig Döderlein (1791–1863), German philologist
Ludwig Heinrich Philipp Döderlein (1855–1936), German zoologist and paleontogist